Loxotrochis sepias is a moth in the family Immidae and the sole species of genus Loxotrochis. It was described by Edward Meyrick in 1906. It is found on the New Hebrides.

The wingspan is about 28 mm. The forewings are rather dark fuscous, with the veins obscurely paler. The hindwings are dark grey, with a faint purplish tinge.

References

Immidae
Moths of Oceania
Monotypic moth genera
Taxa named by Edward Meyrick